Anurag Engineering College is a college in Telangana, India. It was established in 2001.

Departments 

Electronics & Communication Engineering
Mechanical Engineering
Electrical & Electronics Engineering
 Civil Engineering
Master Of Computer Application
Master Of Business Administration
Humanities

Anurag Group of Institutions 
 Anurag Engineering College, Kodad
 Anurag Pharmacy College, Kodad
 Anurag College of Engineering, Hyderabad
 Vidya Jyothi Institute of Technology
 Lalitha Pharmacy College
 Sri Sai Degree College
 einstein Post Graduation College

Nalgonda district
Engineering colleges in Telangana
Educational institutions established in 2001
2001 establishments in Andhra Pradesh